Silybum marianum is a species of thistle.  It has various common names including milk thistle, blessed milkthistle, Marian thistle, Mary thistle, Saint Mary's thistle, Mediterranean milk thistle, variegated thistle and Scotch thistle (though not to be confused with Onopordum acanthium or Cirsium vulgare). This species is an annual or biennial plant of the family Asteraceae. This fairly typical thistle has red to purple flowers and shiny pale green leaves with white veins. Originally a native of Southern Europe through to Asia, it is now found throughout the world.

Description

The stem is grooved and may be covered in a light cottony fuzz. The largest specimens have hollow stems.

The leaves are oblong to lanceolate and 15–60 cm long and typically pinnately lobed, with spiny edges like most thistles. They are hairless, shiny green, with milk-white veins.

The flower heads are 4 to 12 cm long and wide, of red-purple colour.  They flower from June to August in the North or December to February in the Southern Hemisphere (summer through autumn). The flower head is surround by bracts which are hairless, with triangular, spine-edged appendages, tipped with a stout yellow spine.

The fruits are black achenes with a simple long white pappus, surrounded by a yellow basal ring. A long pappus acts as a "parachute", supporting seed dispersal by wind.

Distribution and habitat
Silybum marianum is native to the Mediterranean region of Europe including Greece (mostly in Crete), east into Iran and Afghanistan. It is possibly native near the coast of southeast England. S. marianum has been widely introduced outside its natural range, for example into North America, Hawaii, Australia, New Zealand, Colombia where it is considered an invasive weed. Additionally, today it also spreads as invasive plant in almost all of Europe as a consequence of field cultivation.

Silybum marianum establishes itself in sunny, warm ruderal meadows in regularly disturbed places such as rubble deposits, at the foot of south-exposed walls or villages and on urban fallow land or on cattle pastures. However, it does not prefer dry, stony soils.

Milk thistle has been potentially observed to modify fire regimes in its invasive range. Its invasion into new habitats may also be encouraged by fire.

The "giant thistle of the Pampas" reported by Darwin in the Voyage of the Beagle is thought by some to be Silybum marianum.

Cultivation
Milk thistle is an adaptive crop with low requirements. It is mainly cultivated as a medicinal plant but it's also mentioned as a food source. It's mainly cultivated in Europe but also in Asia and North America.  Milk thistle is a biennial plant, it is normally grown as a annual plant, which simplifies cultivation. This can be achieved when the main requirements are met, then the milk thistle already blossoms in the first year.

Milk thistle has low soil requirements and is drought resistant. The optimal pH ranges from 5.5 to 7.6, but a wide range is acceptable. The seeds are directly sown into the soil with a sowing depth of 1 to 1.5 cm. For germination, a minimal temperature of 2 °C is needed. Sowing can be done in Autumn or in Spring, depending on the climate conditions. Row spacing is between 40 and 75 cm with a plant space of about 25 cm in the rows. Fertilization is not necessarily needed because of the low nutrient requirements. A standard fertilization rate of 50 kg nitrogen, 30 kg phosphorus and 60 kg potassium per hectare is applied before sowing, to improve yields. Harvest normally occurs in July or August. Since the flower heads don't ripen evenly, optimal harvest time is about a fortnight after 50% of the flower heads are dry. For harvesting a common cereal combine harvester can be used. In Poland, average yields are 1230 kg per ha with an average silmarin content of 26.5 kg per ha.

Chemistry 

Traditional milk thistle extract is made from the seeds, which contain approximately 4–6% silymarin. The extract consists of about 65–80% silymarin (a flavonolignan complex) and 20–35% fatty acids, including linoleic acid. Silymarin is a complex mixture of polyphenolic molecules, including seven closely related flavonolignans (silybin A, silybin B, isosilybin A, isosilybin B, silychristin, isosilychristin, silydianin) and one flavonoid (taxifolin). Silibinin, a semipurified fraction of silymarin, is primarily a mixture of 2 diastereoisomers, silybin A and silybin B, in a roughly 1:1 ratio.

Traditional medicine and adverse effects
Although milk thistle has been used in traditional medicine for centuries, there is no clinical evidence that it has any medicinal effect, and the quality of research has been poor. Silymarin is extracted from the milk thistle seeds and available as a standardized extract. In 2019, Cancer Research UK stated: "We need a lot more research with reliable clinical trials before we can be sure that milk thistle will play any part in treating or preventing cancers."

Use of milk thistle may cause stomach upset and produce allergic reactions in some people.

Toxicity
Milk thistle based supplements have been measured to have the highest mycotoxin concentrations of up to 37 mg/kg when compared to various plant-based dietary supplements.

Animal toxicity
Because of nitrate content, the plant has been found to be toxic to cattle and sheep. When potassium nitrate is eaten by ruminants, the bacteria in the animal's stomach breaks the chemical down, producing nitrite ions. Nitrite ions then combine with hemoglobin to produce methemoglobin, blocking the transport of oxygen. The result is a form of oxygen deprivation.

References

Further reading
 
 UC Davis profile for blessed thistle
 

marianum
Medicinal plants
Christian folklore
CYP3A4 inhibitors
Flora of Lebanon
Flora of Israel
Flora of Palestine (region)
Flora of Europe
Edible plants